Green Bluff is a small unincorporated farming community and census-designated place in Spokane County, Washington, it is named after a nearby cliff.

The 2010 census population was 761. The 2010 census was the first time the community has been recognized by the U.S. Census bureau. The town has a grange hall, church, fire station and general store and is known for equestrian properties as well as small farms.

Early history
Long ago Native Americans burned away the underbrush on the bluff to give them better vision while they hunted game. A repercussion of this act was the growth of thick green grass around the evergreen trees, giving the area a park-like appearance. The bluff was given the name "Green Bluff" by early pioneers.

Peone Prairie, a valley to the south of the bluff was a gathering place for Native American tribes who frequented Green Bluff. Baptiste Peone was chief of the valley camp, and his wife and children were baptized by Ref. J.M. Cataldo in 1864. Cataldo became missionary for the Spokanees in 1867, and soon baptized every member of the camp.

As many as 500 Native Americans gathered in the valley for horse races. Green Bluff was favored as a lookout spot and hunting ground for the natives of the area. Most of the trappers and hunters eventually moved on, and a lumber industry with several saw mills arose in the area. Some pioneers took logs to Newman Lake, and traded them for lumber. Many homes were built from the area’s wood.

Some families from Germany moved into the area around 1889. There were still many pine and fir tree roots on the bluff, so much of the early work by these settlers was removal of the roots, which took a great deal of work and time. As time passed, the area was opened up to farming. There were few trails and no roads on the bluff, so transportation was difficult. Because of the vast amount of roots that needed to be cleared, the early settlers had to find a crop that would grow between tree stumps. Strawberries were the early choice, and were picked for years.

Since Green Bluff was a day’s ride by wagon northeast of Spokane, in 1909 the area was officially called the "Green Bluff Township #20." Officers who carried out governing duties such as a clerk, assessor and treasurer were elected by the community and held monthly and annual meetings until 1972, when the township was disbanded by demand of the county. It was one of the last townships in the area.

The Green Bluff Grange is described as "an agricultural fraternity and its purpose is to build a program of fellowship, service and member activities." Green Bluff Grange #300 was first organized in 1909, and meetings were held twice a month, on the second and fourth Saturdays of the month. In March 1909, the idea of building a community hall was proposed, and the hall was soon built by many local people who purchased shares. Meetings were held in the hall except when the $5 a month rent could not be paid. On those months, meetings were held in the schoolhouse. Then in 1916 the Hall burned down. There were long periods of inactivity at this point, until 1929 when the idea of building a new Grange Hall was proposed. It wasn’t until 1934 that an old boarding house in Elk, Washington was torn down and the wood was used to build the new Grange Hall. It was completed in May 1935, and still stands to this day, serving the community every month.

There are many farms on Green Bluff which can be found at GreenbluffGrowers.com. Green Bluff is known for dry land farming and is home to breweries, a winery, cidery, meadery, and catering company, as well as an abundance of fresh produce including strawberries, rhubarb, lavender, cherries, raspberries, apricots, peaches, pears, blackberries, apples, nectarines, potatoes, carrots, cabbages, christmas trees and much more.

Local buildings
In central Green Bluff, there is a school, a church, a fire station, a grange hall, and a general store.

School
Green Bluff School District #101 was formed on February 18, 1891. Land was purchased in 1891 for purpose of building a school. Another acre of land was given to the school some years later. In the early years, the school was surrounded by apple trees that had to be dug out by hand. The first school was a one-room log building. By 1901, a new, one-room framed school was built. In June 1906, a second room was added; in 1910, a third room was added. In 1945, the frame schoolhouse was dismantled and a new "chicken-house" was built, which still stands today.

In 1952 it was faced with brick, and in 1969 a third classroom was added. In 1970 its doors were closed, until 1972 when it became the Green Bluff Learning Center, which was an alternative school for boys with special learning needs. That lasted until 1976. Then in 1977, because of crowded conditions, all first-graders from Colbert Elementary School were transferred to Green Bluff’s school, which continued until 1980, the last year that students were taught at the school. It was later purchase by the local church, serving as a community center and pre-school.

Church
The first Green Bluff United Methodist Church was built in 1909. It was created by the community, since until that time, only a visiting minister provided Sunday school, just once a month. The community agreed to pay him a $200 salary to come every Sunday and provide services in the schoolhouse until a church could be built. Many pastors served the church in its early years, coming from the Peone or the Mead parsonage. On March 16, 1945, the church was completely destroyed by fire. The cause is assumed to be an overheated furnace. Church services took place in the grange until the new church’s dedication on May 4, 1947. That building still stands to this day, ministered by the Mead parsonage.

General store
The Green Bluff General Store has existed for over a hundred years, surviving two locations, two fires and three different buildings. It no longer has the full-service use it once did, but the location on the corner of Green Bluff and Day-Mt. Spokane Rd. hasn’t changed since 1910. It was originally located at the corner of Halliday and Day-Mt. Spokane Rd., and called "Abbott’s Store." After a year or two the store closed due to a property dispute. In 1910 the first store in its present location was built. It burned around 1923 or ’24. Rev. Wellington operated the "Green Bluff Mercantile" for twenty years, sometimes marrying people in the store rather than the church. In 1955 the store burned down, and a replacement store wasn’t built until 1958. It still stands to this day, although there have been many different owners. Nowadays, the store is relatively abandoned, only opened occasionally to sell arts and crafts.

Fire station
The original Green Bluff Fire Station was built in the early 1960s northeast of the Green Bluff store and church. It was a small red building housing a 5 to 7-thousand gallon water tank beneath it. Need for a fire station arose after the 1955 burning of the general store and a local barn. Fundraising for the fire station took place in 1960. The first fire chief was elected in November 1962, and in January 1963, Green Bluff got its first fire truck, a 1963 GMC converted gasoline delivery truck. A new station was built in the 1990s west of the school and church, and continues to serve the area.

References

External links
 
 U.S. Department of Agriculture. Green Bluff Series. Describes characteristics of the soil in the area.

Census-designated places in Washington (state)
Census-designated places in Spokane County, Washington